Baladeh District is a district (bakhsh) in Nur County, Mazandaran Province, Iran. At the 2006 census, its population was 6,594, in 2,140 families.  The District has one city: Baladeh.  The District has three rural districts (dehestan): Owzrud Rural District, Sheykh Fazlolah-e Nuri Rural District, and Tatarestaq Rural District.

References 

Nur County
Districts of Mazandaran Province